Eastern Federal Credit Union Insurance Building is a tall building located in Dhaka, Bangladesh. It is located in Motijheel, the central business district of the metropolis. It houses the headquarters of Eastern Federal Credit Union Insurance. Currently, it is one of the tallest High-rises in Bangladesh.

See also
 List of tallest buildings in Dhaka

References 

Buildings and structures in Dhaka
Skyscraper office buildings in Bangladesh
Motijheel Thana
Commercial buildings completed in 1972